Malaya refers to a number of historical and current political entities related to what is currently Peninsular Malaysia in Southeast Asia:

Political entities
 British Malaya (1826–1957), a loose collection of the British colony of the Straits Settlements and the British protectorates of the Malay States
 Malayan Union (1946–1948), a post-war British colony consisting of all the states and settlements in British Malaya except Singapore
 Federation of Malaya (1948–1963), the successor to the Malayan Union, which gained independence within the Commonwealth of Nations in 1957
 The merger between the States of Malaya (1963–present)

Science
 Megisba malaya, a butterfly commonly called the Malayan

People
 Malaya Akulukjuk (born 1915?), Canadian Inuit artist
 Malaya Drew (born 1978), American actress
 Malaya Marcelino, Canadian politician
 Oxana Malaya (born 1983), Ukrainian mental patient known for her morbid dog-like childhood behaviour

Other uses 
 University of Malaya, Kuala Lumpur, Malaysia
 , a Royal Navy battleship which served in both world wars
 Operation Malaya, a police investigation taking place in Spain
 Malaya (film), a 1949 American war film set in Japanese-occupied Malaya
 Malaya (newspaper), a newspaper in the Philippines
 Malaya (album), an album by Filipino singer, Moira Dela Torre
 Malaya Mountains, a place in Hindu mythology
 Malaya Kuonamka, a river in Yakutia, Russia

See also 

 M'alayah, a dance of East Africa and Eastern Arabia
 Malay (disambiguation)
 Malayalam, a South Asian language
 Malays (disambiguation)
 Malays (ethnic group)
 Malaysia, a federal constitutional monarchy in Southeast Asia
 Malaysian (disambiguation)